GCAA may refer to:

 Gambia Civil Aviation Authority
 Georgia Collegiate Athletic Association
 General Civil Aviation Authority, United Arab Emirates
 Ghana Civil Aviation Authority
 Golf Coaches Association of America
 Guyana Civil Aviation Authority